PDMS (Plant Design Management System) as it is known in the 3D CAD industry, is a customizable, multi-user and multi-discipline, engineer controlled design software package for engineering, design and construction projects in offshore and onshore.

The Computer-Aided Design Centre (or CADCentre as it was more commonly referred to, and later formally became) was created in Cambridge, England, UK in 1967 by the UK Ministry of Technology. Its mission was to develop computer-aided design techniques and promote their take-up by British industry.  The centre carried out much pioneering CAD research, and many of its early staff members went on to become prominent in the worldwide CAD community, such as brothers Dick Newell and Martin Newell.

Dick Newell oversaw the creation of the Plant Design Management System (PDMS) for 3D process plant design. He later co-founded two software companies – Cambridge Interactive Systems (CIS) which was  known for its Medusa 2D/3D CAD system, and Smallworld with its eponymous Smallworld GIS (Geographical Information System). Martin Newell later went to the University of Utah where he did pioneering 3D solid modelling work; he was also one of the progenitors of PostScript.

Subsequently the UK government, via the British Technology Group (BTG) established a separate company, Compeda Ltd, to exploit software developed and owned by the government and they took over the marketing and user support of PDMS, while the software continued to be developed by the CADCentre, with funding from Compeda.

When the UK government decided to privatise (sell) anything that did not need to be government owned, Compeda Ltd was sold to Prime Computer Inc.  for a net negative sum of money.   Prime Computer decided that PDMS had no commercial value or future and returned the marketing rights for the product to CADCentre.

The latest release, as of March 2021, is AVEVA PDMS 12.1.SP5

AVEVA has introduced latest version of PDMS is AVEVA Everything 3D (E3D). Current version of AVEVA Everything 3D is 2.1 (Expected to Launch 3.1 very soon)

AVEVA Everything 3D has been introduced with the new UI and with advance functions. Ease of modelling, Quick Modelling functionality, More User friendly.

User Groups

Existing

Defunct

See also
 MPDS4

External links
 AVEVA Group website

References

Computer-aided design software
History of computing in the United Kingdom
Science and technology in Cambridgeshire